William DeWitt Mitchell (September 9, 1874August 24, 1955) was an American attorney who had served as both Solicitor General of the United States under President Calvin Coolidge and United States Attorney General under President Herbert Hoover.

Early life and education
Mitchell was born in Winona, Minnesota to William B. Mitchell, a Minnesota Supreme Court Justice, and the former Frances Merritt. Mitchell originally attended Yale University where he studied electrical engineering before becoming interested in law.

After attending Yale for two years, Mitchell transferred to the University of Minnesota, where he received his A.B. degree in 1895 and a member of the Delta Kappa Epsilon fraternity. Afterwards, he enrolled at the University of Minnesota Law School where he received his LL.B. degree in 1896. Shortly after graduating from law school, Mitchell was admitted to the Minnesota State Bar Association and practiced law in Saint Paul, Minnesota. He married the former Gertrude Bancroft on June 27, 1901. They had two sons which were William and Bancroft Mitchell.

Career

He formed the law firm of How, Taylor & Mitchell, which became prominent in the Midwest. This prestige allowed Mitchell access to both the regional council of the U.S. Railroad Administration in 1919, and then he served as chairman of the Citizens Charter Committee of St. Paul in 1922.

Military service
He served as a line officer with the 15th Minnesota Volunteer Infantry Regiment and later an acting judge advocate for the United States Second Army Corps during the Spanish–American War. From 1899 to 1901 he was an engineer officer for the 3rd Brigade of the 1st Infantry Division and later adjutant for the 4th Infantry Regiment of the Minnesota Army National Guard. During the First World War he served with the 6th Infantry Regiment of the Minnesota Army National Guard and later served at Camp Taylor, Kentucky until the war was over. He reached the rank of Colonel.

Government service
His combined military service placed him in position to be appointed to the position of Solicitor General of the United States. Having served well in his position, President Hoover appointed him Attorney General of the United States from March 4, 1929, and he held that office until March 4, 1933, one of his principal acts having been to order the Bonus Army dispersed and their camp destroyed.

Later career
Mitchell then settled in New York City where he practiced law. He was named chairman of the Committee on Federal Rules of Civil Procedure, and chief counsel of the joint congressional committee investigating the attack on Pearl Harbor.

Mitchell died there in Syosset, New York on August 24, 1955, at the age of 80.

References

External links

Profile from the Department of Justice

1874 births
1955 deaths
Minnesota lawyers
New York (state) lawyers
Yale University alumni
University of Minnesota alumni
University of Minnesota Law School alumni
United States Solicitors General
People of the Spanish–American War
United States Army personnel of World War I
United States Army officers
United States Attorneys General
Presidents of the New York City Bar Association
Hoover administration cabinet members
20th-century American politicians
Minnesota Republicans
New York (state) Republicans
People from Winona, Minnesota
Military personnel from Minnesota